Events in the year 1947 in Bulgaria.

Incumbents 

 General Secretaries of the Bulgarian Communist Party: Georgi Dimitrov
 Chairmen of the Council of Ministers: Georgi Dimitrov

Events 

 Bulgaria's second constitution, the Dimitrov Constitution, came into effect. It was later replaced by the Zhivkov Constitution in 1971.

Sports

References 

 
1940s in Bulgaria
Years of the 20th century in Bulgaria
Bulgaria
Bulgaria